Diocese or Archdiocese of Santiago may refer to the following (former and/or present) ecclesiastical jurisdictions — bishoprics or archbishoprics — with see in a city called Santiago (after Saint James, in Spanish):

Africa
 Roman Catholic Diocese of Santiago de Cabo Verde  on Cape Verde

America
 Anglican Diocese of Santiago in Chile
 Roman Catholic Archdiocese of Santiago de Chile in Chile
 Roman Catholic Archdiocese of Santiago de Cuba on Cuba
 Roman Catholic Archdiocese of Santiago de los Caballeros on Hispaniola, in the Dominican Republic
 Roman Catholic Diocese of Santiago del Estero in Argentina
 Roman Catholic Diocese of Santiago de María in El Salvador
 Roman Catholic Diocese of Santiago de Veraguas in Panama

Asia
 Diocese of Santiago; see Episcopal Church in the Philippines#Dioceses
 Diocese of Santiago (Philippine Independent Church); see List of dioceses of the Philippine Independent Church

Europe
 Roman Catholic Archdiocese of Santiago de Compostela in Galicia, Spain